Rainbow Falls is a waterfall located in Chimney Rock, Rutherford County, North Carolina.

History
Rainbow Falls was owned privately until it was purchased by The Nature Conservancy in 2003.  While much of the area is expected to be developed into a state park, including the nearby Chimney Rock Park, current plans to make Rainbow Falls accessible to the public are uncertain.

Visiting the Falls
Access to Rainbow Falls is prohibited. It will be more difficult to view the falls during the summer and fall due to foliage on the trees, and binoculars will make viewing them easier.

Nearby Falls
There are several falls above the main drop of Hickory Nut Falls.  Other falls in the area include:

 Hickory Nut Falls
 Camp Minnehaha Falls - a cascade on Grassy Creek that has a winter roadside view.  To see the falls, from the Intersection of US 74A and NC 9, go .8 miles north.  Parks in the pullout on the left just before the guardrail.
 The Cascades - a waterfall on Grassy Creek upstream from Camp Minnehaha Falls that is on private property
 Pool Creek Falls - a slide waterfall in an area currently restricted to public access, but that will be part of the new State Park
 Wolf Creek Falls - another waterfall in the same restricted area

External links
Rainbow Falls at the Nature Conservency, where you may view a picture of the falls.

Protected areas of Rutherford County, North Carolina
Waterfalls of North Carolina
Landforms of Rutherford County, North Carolina